Clandestine service may refer to:
Espionage
Defense Clandestine Service, a part of the Defense Intelligence Agency
National Clandestine Service, a part of the CIA